The Ralph Cantafio Soccer Complex, originally known as the Winnipeg Soccer Complex, is a multi-use stadium in Winnipeg, Manitoba. It is currently used mostly for soccer matches. The main pitch, John Scouras Field, holds 2,000 spectators. The complex replaced Alexander Park as the main soccer venue in Winnipeg. It has also hosted some matches for the Canada men's national soccer team.

The complex was renamed in 2016, in honor of Ralph Cantafio, a local soccer executive and pioneer for the sport in the province of Manitoba.

External links
Stadium information

References

Soccer venues in Manitoba
Sports venues in Winnipeg
Venues of the 1999 Pan American Games
1991 establishments in Manitoba
Sports venues completed in 1991

Fort Garry, Winnipeg